Langholm , also known colloquially as the "Muckle Toon", is a burgh in Dumfries and Galloway, southern Scotland. Langholm lies between four hills in the valley of the River Esk in the Southern Uplands.

Location and geography

Langholm is surrounded by four hills in the River Esk valley within Scotland's wider Southern Uplands. The highest of the four hills is 300 m high Whita hill on which stands an obelisk (locally known as 'The Monument'). The Monument commemorates the life and achievements of Sir John Malcolm (1769‑1833), former soldier, statesman, and historian. The other three hills are Warblaw (in Langholm it is pronounced Warbla), Meikleholmhill (a knowe of which is known as 'Timpen') and the Castle Hill.

The two longest B roads in the UK both start (or finish) in Langholm.  The B6318 which goes to Heddon-on-the-Wall and is 61 miles long, and the B709 which joins the A7 near Heriot after 58 miles.

History

Langholm was founded in 1455 during the Battle of Arkinholm.

A fort at Langholm was occupied by English soldiers during the war known as the Rough Wooing. Thomas Wharton reported that at the end of April 1543, the soldiers burnt farms at Whitslade in Teviotdale. Regent Arran successfully besieged the fort in July 1547 and then travelled to the siege of St Andrews Castle to meet a French force.

Langholm is the traditional seat of Clan Armstrong, which is currently represented globally by the official Clan Armstrong Trust. The Episcopalian church on Castle Holm went into disuse before conversion into the Clan Armstrong museum.

The town was an important centre for the Border Reivers. The town later grew around the textile industry. Langholm Town Hall was completed in 1813.

In 2020, the local community purchased 5,000 acres (2,000 hectares) of Langholm Moor for £3.8m from Buccleuch Estates.

Governance
Langholm is in the parliamentary constituency of Dumfriesshire, Clydesdale and Tweeddale, David Mundell is the current Conservative Party Member of Parliament (MP).

The town is part of the South Scotland region in the Scottish Parliament, being in the constituency of Dumfriesshire. Oliver Mundell of the Conservatives is the MSP.

Prior to Brexit for the European Parliament, Langholm was part of the Scotland constituency.

Langholm is part of the Annandale East and Eskdale ward for both Dumfries and Galloway Council and Dumfries and Galloway Youth Council. The ward is represented by 3 Councillors (2x Con & 1x Lab) and 2 Youth Councillors.

The town is also part of the Dumfriesshire constituency for the Scottish Youth Parliament and is represented by 2 Members of the Scottish Youth Parliament (MSYPs).

Notable visitors and residents

Neil Armstrong
In 1972, astronaut Neil Armstrong, was welcomed and made the first freeman and Burgess of the burgh. The depute town clerk at the time later said, “The town council had made the approach because this is Armstrong country and we thought it would be appropriate. It turned out that he was coming to Edinburgh to deliver the Mountbatten lecture so he could accept and come to Langholm.”

The ceremony took place at Langholm's largest building of the time, the parish church. With his manner of modest dignity he stated: 

He also commented:

”My pleasure is not only that this is the land of Johnnie Armstrong, rather that my pleasure is in knowing that this is my home town and in the genuine feeling that I have among these hills among these people.”

He then walked for lunch at Buccleuch Hall. His visit is captured in online video. In coverage by the international press, the Chicago Tribune'''s front-page story included a map of the British Isles marking only London and Langholm. Armstrong universally known for his humility is remembered as having no interest on his visit of boasting of his achievements. Instead he was absorbed in finding out more of his Armstrong heritage and making a connection with the area.

Others
Thomas Telford was born nearby and worked in Langholm as an apprentice early in his career.

Christopher Murray Grieve (known as Hugh Macdiarmid) was born in Langholm. The Scottish poet  was a leading light in the Scottish Renaissance of the 20th century. Unusual for a communist, he was a committed Scottish nationalist and wrote both in English and in literary Scots. The town is home to a monument in his honour made of COR-TEN(r) steel which takes the form of a large open book depicting images from his writings.

The first female corporate member of the Institution of Civil Engineers, Dorothy Donaldson Buchanan, was born and raised in Langholm, daughter of Rev. James Donaldson Buchanan, the longtime minister in Langholm Parish.

David Thomas Richardson, a linguist and officer of the Bengal Army was born in Langholm.

Dave Stevenson, Olympic pole vaulter (1964 Tokyo Games) and businessman, was raised in the burgh and his company was based there.

Economy

Edinburgh Woollen Mill was founded in Langholm in 1946 by Drew Stevenson, however they moved their headquarters from Langholm to Carlisle in 2019.

Buccleuch Estates have an office in Langholm and own much of the surrounding land.

 Transport 
Bus
The X95 cross-border bus service (which is operated by Borders Buses) runs through Langholm, the service largely follows the route of the A7 road between Edinburgh and Carlisle via Hawick + Galashiels in the Scottish Borders.

Rail
Langholm railway station opened in April 1864, but closed 100 years later. The last regular passenger train was on 13 June 1964, although a special ran in March 1967; complete with restaurant car; the freight service continued until September 1967.

Local media 
Newspaper
The local newspaper is the Eskdale & Liddesdale Advertiser based on Langholm High Street. The Advertiser'' was owned by the CN Group Ltd. The paper covers news from Langholm and its surrounding areas (notably Canonbie & Newcastleton) and is commonly referred to locally as 'The Squeak'. Established in 1848, the newspaper was the first penny newspaper in Scotland.

Radio
Outside of the nationwide services it is possible to receive transmissions by:-

 BBC Radio Cumbria
 BBC Radio Scotland
 Radio Borders
 West Sound

Education 
Langholm Academy and Langholm Primary were established in the 1800s (the original building of which still stands).

The schools run sessions in the community with various groups such as Wild Eskdale and Outpost Arts to expand and improve pupils' skills and community interests.

Sport 
In 1858 Langholm Cricket Club was founded. The club play their matches on the Castleholm Ground. They currently play their matches in the Border League.

In 1871, Langholm RFC was founded, being the oldest Rugby club in the Borders. Langholm RFC play in Scottish National League Division 1 and in the Border League.

Langholm also has a minor football team, Langholm Legion, who also play on the Castleholm

The town also has a karate club, Langholm Shotokan Karate Club, which is part of the JKS Scotland.

Langholm Scouts (2nd Dumfriesshire) has been running for many decades, with some members attending the biggest events in Scouting, including the World Scout Jamboree and Blair Atholl Jamborette.

Arts and leisure 

As well as the Scottish Episcopal Church now used as the Clan Armstrong museum, The Roman Catholic church of St Francis of Assisi closed in 2010 and is now a fine art gallery.

The Buccleuch Centre, is a well equipped venue with providing a regular programme of music and theatre.

The town is home to a music and arts festival, a food festival and the Langholm walks. Each year the annual Common Riding, takes place on the last Friday of July which features horse riding, sports, dancing and musical processions by the Pipe and Town Bands.

Langholm has both a pipe band and a brass band (known as the Town Band - or colloquially as The Toon Ban'). The Town Band is the oldest continuous brass band in Scotland and has won many national awards.

The town is also home to the Eskdale and Liddesdale Archaeological Society.

The Langholm Archive Group has a collection of information, photographs etc. about the locality.

Langholm Project 
The 'Langholm Project' or 'Langholm Study' is a reference to the Joint Raptor Study, a scientific study undertaken in the 1990s on Langholm Moor into the effects of raptors on red grouse populations. This was a large-scale project involving a range of organisations including Game Conservancy Trust, CEH (or ITE as they were then known) and Buccleuch estates. The project was followed by a two-year study on the effects of supplementary feeding of harriers, which ended in 1999. The findings of the study and the effect on the moor have been the subject of much debate. In 2007 the Scottish Government announced a further 10-year project with the following aims:

  aim to establish a commercially viable driven grouse moor. Within the time frame of the project, it is the intention to sell driven grouse days producing an annual income in excess of £100,000.
 aim to restore an important site for nature conservation to favourable condition
 seek to demonstrate whether the needs of an economically viable grouse moor can be met alongside the conservation needs of protected raptors, especially the hen harrier.
This more recent study is officially titled The Langholm Moor Demonstration Project, but like its predecessor it is generally known as 'the Langholm Project'.
The current project is a joint venture between Buccleuch Estates, Scottish Natural Heritage, Game & Wildlife Conservation Trust, RSPB and Natural England.

See also
 Duke of Buccleuch

References

External links 

 Langholm Online
 Video of Langholm from the Air
 The Langholm Walks and Walking Festival
 Search the local paper archive
 The Buccleuch Centre
 The Eskdale & Liddesdale Advertiser
 The Langholm Page
 The Langholm Project
 Centre Stage Youth Theatre

 
Towns in Dumfries and Galloway
Parishes in Dumfries and Galloway